

347001–347100 

|-id=028
| 347028 Važec ||  || Važec, a village in northern Slovakia, within the district of Liptovský Mikuláš in the Žilina Region. || 
|}

347101–347200 

|-bgcolor=#f2f2f2
| colspan=4 align=center | 
|}

347201–347300 

|-id=266
| 347266 Carrière ||  || Jean-Claude Carrière (1931–2021) was a French novelist, screenwriter, actor, and Academy Award honoree. He was a frequent collaborator with Luis Buñuel on the screenplays of Buñuel's late French films. || 
|}

347301–347400 

|-id=336
| 347336 Changmeemann ||  || Chang Meemann (born 1936) is an academician of the Chinese Academy of Sciences and pioneered the study of tetrapod origin in China. Her pioneer work has revolutionized research on early vertebrate evolution. || 
|}

347401–347500 

|-bgcolor=#f2f2f2
| colspan=4 align=center | 
|}

347501–347600 

|-bgcolor=#f2f2f2
| colspan=4 align=center | 
|}

347601–347700 

|-bgcolor=#f2f2f2
| colspan=4 align=center | 
|}

347701–347800 

|-bgcolor=#f2f2f2
| colspan=4 align=center | 
|}

347801–347900 

|-bgcolor=#f2f2f2
| colspan=4 align=center | 
|}

347901–348000 

|-id=940
| 347940 Jorgezuluaga ||  || Jorge Zuluaga (born 1975) is a researcher, educator and popularizer of astronomy. || 
|}

References 

347001-348000